Dahn is German surname, and may refer to:

Alvin Dahn (born 1948), American musician
Bernice Dahn (born 1965), Liberian politician
Craig Dahn (born 1964), American pianist
Daniela Dahn (born 1949), German writer
Felix Dahn (1834–1912), German lawyer and writer
Jeff Dahn (born 1957), Canadian battery researcher
Nancy Dahn, Canadian violinist

See also
Dahn

German-language surnames
Jewish masculine given names
Hebrew masculine given names